Gretchen Kimberly Berland is an American physician and filmmaker who is Associate Professor of Medicine at the Yale School of Medicine.

Life
She graduated from Pomona College with a BA in 1986 and Oregon Health & Science University with an MD in 1996. 
She was a Fellow in the UCLA Robert Wood Johnson Clinical Scholars Program.

Awards
 2004 MacArthur Fellowship

Works
  Berland, G., Elliott, M., Morales, L. “Health Information on the Internet: Accessibility, Quality, and Readability in English and Spanish.” JAMA. 285 (20): 2612–2621. 2001 May.
 Berland, G., Morales, L., Elliott, M. "A Report on the Quality of Health Information on the Internet.” RAND Health. May 2001.
"The View from the Other Side — Patients, Doctors, and the Power of a Camera", NEJM, Volume 357:2533-2536, December 20, 2007, Number 25
 Rolling (life in a wheelchair). A 71-minute feature-length documentary that has been widely acclaimed for providing unique patient-centered perspectives into the lives of wheelchair users.

References

External links
Gretchen Berland, MacArthur Genius Award Winner, NPR, September 28, 2004

Physicians from Connecticut
Yale School of Medicine faculty
Pomona College alumni
Oregon Health & Science University alumni
MacArthur Fellows
American filmmakers
Year of birth missing (living people)
Living people